Lawrence is a subway station on Line 1 Yonge–University in Toronto, Ontario, Canada. It is located under Yonge Street at Lawrence Avenue, in the Bedford Park, Lawrence Park and Lytton Park neighbourhoods.

Description
The station is on four levels, all the entrances to the station are at street level, the concourse and collector level is on the second level, the bus platform is on the third level, and the subway platform is on the lower level. Both the subway and bus levels have a centre platform.

Out of view from customers, there is an attic extending above and along the length of the subway platform. The attic contains ventilation equipment, a TTC substation and a city sewer pipe. There is a double crossover just south of the subway platforms.

There are four entrances to the station located in the surrounding area:
 entrance on Lawrence Avenue, west of Yonge Street, leading to the south-side mezzanine level
 entrance on Lawrence Avenue, east of Yonge Street, leading to the south-side mezzanine level
 entrance via sidewalk staircase at Bedford Park Avenue, leading to the north-side mezzanine level
 entrance via sidewalk staircase at Ranleigh Avenue, leading to the north-side mezzanine level

The south-side mezzanine leads down to the bus and subway levels. The unstaffed north-side mezzanine leads directly to the subway level.

History
Lawrence station is one of the deepest stations on the subway system, as it provides a transition in depth between Eglinton station and York Mills station in the Hoggs Hollow valley. It was constructed using the cut-and-cover method down to the platform level. Lawrence was the first station in the network to feature an underground bus terminal.

On April 23, 2007, TTC employee Antonio Almeida was killed in the tunnel just south of the station when a platform on his work car was dislodged.

In 2012, a series of renovations repaired the deteriorating concrete of the bus roadway and tunnel walls. Between the fourth quarter of 2012 and mid-2015, four high-capacity fire ventilation fans were installed at the station.

In 2015, the owner of the building at 3080 Yonge Street (at the northwest corner of Lawrence Street West) proposed to incorporate the TTC entrance at that corner into a renovation project for the building. The old TTC entrance building would be demolished; the renovated building would incorporate a new TTC entrance at ground level. The TTC requested that there be provision for an elevator. These renovations were carried out, and the renovated TTC entrance was opened.

Future
In June 2022, construction work to make Lawrence station accessible started, with an estimated completion of the project expected in 2024. Two elevators will be added, one from street level to the concourse level and a second from the concourse to the bus and subway levels. A new stairway will be added from the concourse to the subway platform. Signage and wayfinding will be improved throughout the station. The station will have a fifth entrance to house the elevator from street level to the concourse; it will be located on the north side of a Tim Hortons outlet, a few doors north of the existing entrance at the northwest corner of Yonge Street and Lawrence Avenue. During construction, the TTC will close the two Lawrence Avenue entrances plus the underground bus terminal for about 8 months in 2023. Customers will be able to access the subway platform only via the Bedford Park and Ranleigh entrances. In addition, the station will be fully closed on three weekends in 2022.

Nearby landmarks
 Nearby there are a series of parks that run through Chatsworth and Blythwood ravines from Chatsworth Drive and Cheritan Avenue to Bayview Avenue.
 Alexander Muir Memorial Gardens located here
 Toronto Public Library Locke Branch

Surface connections 

Buses enter the station counter to the normal traffic directions so that bus doors will face the centre bus platform.

TTC routes serving the station include:

George Milbrandt Parkette
George Milbrandt Parkette is located at the northeast corner of Yonge Street and Lawrence Avenue East, and shares the small rectangular plot of land with the Lawrence station entrance at that location. At the request of George Milbrandt, acting on behalf of the Bedford Park Residents' Association, the Toronto City Council created the park in 1998. In 1999, the City named the parkette after Milbrandt, who had promoted the parkette's creation for 25 years. The parkette has simple landscaping including shade trees, park benches, grading and grass.

References

External links

Line 1 Yonge–University stations
Railway stations in Canada opened in 1973